Nuruddin Farah (born 24 November 1945) is a Somali novelist. His first novel, From a Crooked Rib, was published in 1970 and has been described as "one of the cornerstones of modern East African literature today". He has also written plays both for stage and radio, as well as short stories and essays. Since leaving Somalia in the 1970s he has lived and taught in numerous countries, including the United States, Britain, Germany, Italy, Sweden, Sudan, India, Uganda, Nigeria and South Africa.

Farah has garnered acclaim as one of the greatest contemporary writers in the world, his prose having earned him accolades including the Premio Cavour in Italy, the Kurt Tucholsky Prize in Germany, the Lettre Ulysses Award in Berlin, and in 1998, the prestigious Neustadt International Prize for Literature. In the same year, the French edition of his novel Gifts won the St Malo Literature Festival's prize. In addition, Farah is a perennial nominee for the Nobel Prize in Literature.

Personal life
Nuruddin Farah was born in 1945 in Baidoa, in Italian Somaliland. His father Hassan Farah was a merchant and his mother Aleeli (née Faduma) an oral poet. Farah was the fourth eldest boy in a large family.

As a child, Farah frequented schools in Somalia and adjacent Ethiopia, attending classes in Kallafo in the Somali State. He studied English, Arabic and Amharic. In 1963, three years after Somalia's independence, he was forced to flee the Somali Galbeed following serious border conflicts.

From 1966 to 1970, he pursued a degree in philosophy, literature and sociology at Panjab University in Chandigarh, India, where he met his first wife, Chitra Muliyil Farah, with whom he had a son (the marriage later ended in divorce). Farah subsequently went to England, attending London University (1974–75) and studying for a master's degree in theatre at Essex University (1975–76). His mother died in 1990, and in 1992 he married British-Nigerian academic Amina Mama and they have a son and a daughter.

In 1990, he received a grant from the German Academic Exchange Service and moved to Berlin. In 1996, he visited Somalia for the first time in more than 20 years.

Farah's sister Basra Farah Hassan, a diplomat, was killed in a bombing in January 2014 while working with the United Nations in Kabul, Afghanistan.

Farah currently resides in Minneapolis, Minnesota, and Cape Town, South Africa.

Literary career

After releasing an early short story in his native Somali language, Farah shifted to writing in English while still attending university in India. His books have been translated into 17 languages.

His first novel, From a Crooked Rib (1970), told the story of a nomad girl who flees from an arranged marriage to a much older man. Published by Heinemann Educational Books (HEB) in their African Writers Series, the novel earned him mild but international acclaim. On a tour of Europe following the publication of A Naked Needle (HEB, 1976), Farah was warned that the Somali government planned to arrest him over its contents. Rather than return and face imprisonment, Farah began a self-imposed exile that would last for 22 years, during which time he taught in the United States, Germany, Italy, Sweden, Sudan, India and Nigeria.

Farah describes his purpose for writing as an attempt "to keep my country alive by writing about it", and for Nadine Gordimer he was one of the continent's "true interpreters". His trilogies of novels – "Variations on the Theme of an African Dictatorship" (1980–83) and "Blood in the Sun" (1986–99) – form the core of his work. First published by Allison and Busby, "Variations" included Sweet and Sour Milk (1979), Sardines (1981) and Close Sesame (1983), and was well received in a number of countries. Farah's reputation was cemented by his most famous novel, Maps (1986), the first part of his "Blood in the Sun" trilogy. Maps, which is set during the Ogaden conflict of 1977, employs the innovative technique of second-person narration for exploring questions of cultural identity in a post-independence world. Farah followed this with Gifts (1993) and Secrets (1998), both of which earned awards. His subsequent "Past Imperfect" trilogy comprises Links (2004), Knots (2007) and Crossbones (2011). His most recent novels are Hiding in Plain Sight, published in 2014, and North of Dawn (2018).

Farah is also a playwright, whose plays include work for the stage — A Dagger in Vacuum (produced Mogadiscio, 1970), The Offering (produced Colchester, Essex, 1975), Yussuf and His Brothers (produced Jos, Nigeria, 1982) — and for radio: Tartar Delight, 1980 (Germany), and A Spread of Butter.

Besides literature, Farah is an important scholar within Somali Studies. He serves on the International Advisory Board of Bildhaan: An International Journal of Somali Studies, published by Macalester College.

Selected awards and honours

 1974–76: UNESCO fellowship
 1980: English-Speaking Union Literary Award (for Sweet and Sour Milk)
 1990: Corman Artists fellowship
 1991: Kurt Tucholsky Prize, Stockholm, Sweden
 1993: Best Novel Award, Zimbabwe (for Gifts)
 1994: Premio Cavour, Italy (for Italian translation of Close Sesame)
 1998: Neustadt International Prize for Literature
 1998: St Malo Literary Festival award (for French edition of Gifts)

Bibliography

Novels

Variations on the Theme of an African Dictatorship trilogy
 Reprints: Heinemann (African Writers Series 226), 1980; Graywolf Press, 1992.
 Reprints: Heinemann (African Writers Series 252), 1982; Graywolf Press, 1992.
 Reprints: Graywolf Press, 1992.
Blood in the Sun trilogy
 Reprints: Arcade, 1999.
 Reprints: Arcade, 1999; Kwela Books, 2001.

Past Imperfect trilogy
 Reprints: Riverhead Books, 2004; Duckworth, 2005.

 Reprints: Granta Books, 2012.

Short fiction
 Novella

Plays

̶̶̶̶̶̶̶̶̶̶̶̶̶̶̶̶-̶̶̶̶̶̶̶̶̶ -̶̶̶̶̶̶̶̶̶  The Offering. Lotus (Afro-Asian Writings) vol. 30, no. 4, 1976, pp. 77–93.

Non-fiction

Essays
Autobiographical and literary essays
 "Celebrating Differences: The 1998 Neustadt Lecture", Emerging Perspectives on Nuruddin Farah, edited by Derek Wright, Africa World Press, 2002, pp. 15–24.
 "Childhood of My Schizophrenia", The Times Literary Supplement, 23–29 November 1990, p. 1264.
 "A Country in Exile", World Literature Today, vol. 72, no. 4, 1998, pp. 713–5. DOI: https://doi.org/10.2307/40154257.
 "The Creative Writer and the Politician". The Classic, vol. 3, no. 1, 1984, pp. 27–30.
 "Do Fences Have Sides?", The Commonwealth in Canada: Proceedings of the Second Triennial Conference of CACLALS, Part 2, edited by Uma Parameswaran, Writers' Workshop, 1983, pp. 174–82.
 "Do You Speak German?!", Okike: An African Journal of New Writing, vol. 22, 1982, pp. 33–8.
 "Germany—And All That Jazz", Okike: An African Journal of New Writing, vol. 18, 1981, pp. 8–12.
 "Ibsen, In Other Words", Nordlit, vol. 34, 2015, pp. 15–22. DOI: https://doi.org/10.7557/13.3350.
 "In Praise of Exile", Literature in Exile, edited by John Glad, Duke University Press, 1990, pp. 64–77.
 "Savaging the Soul of a Nation", The Writer in Politics, edited by William Glass and Lorin Cuoco. Southern Illinois University Press, 1996, pp. 110–5.
 "Why I Write". Emerging Perspectives on Nuruddin Farah, edited by Derek Wright. Africa World Press, 2002

Social and political essays
 "Bastards of Empire", Transition, vol. 65, 1995, pp. 26–35.
 "Centuries-long War for Somali Peninsula", WardheerNews, 12 April 2018. 
 "Country Cousins", London Review of Books, 3 September 1998, pp. 19–20.
 "False Accounting", Granta, vol. 49, 1994, pp. 171–81.
 "My Life as a Diplomat", The New York Times. 26 May 2007. 
 "Of Tamarind and Cosmopolitanism", African Cities Reader, edited by Ntone Edjabe and Edgar Pieterse. Chimurenga, 2010, pp. 178–81.
 "People of a Half-Way House", London Review of Books, 21 March 1996, pp. 19–20.
 "Praise the Marines? I Suppose So", The New York Times, 28 December 1992, pp. 14–17.
 "The Family House". Transition, vol. 99, 2008, pp. 6–15.
 "The Women of Kismayo", The Times Literary Supplement. 15 November 1996, p. 18.
 "Which way to the Sea, Please?" Horn of Africa, vol. 1, no. 4, 1978, pp. 31–6. Republished by WardheerNews, 4 March 2015.

References

Further reading
Alden, Patricia, and Louis Tremain. Nuruddin Farah. Twayne's World Authors Series v. 876. New York: Twayne Publishers, 1999.
Jaggi, Maya, "Bitter crumbs and sour milk - a nation betrayed" (profile of Nuruddin Farah), The Guardian, 18 April 1993. Accessed 27 June 2012.

 Moolla, Fatima Fiona, "Individualism in the Novels of Nuruddin Farah", PhD. thesis, Department of English, University of Cape Town, August 2009.
 Moolla, F. Fiona, Reading Nuruddin Farah: The Individual, the Novel & the Idea of Home, James Currey, 2014.
Wright, Derek. The Novels of Nuruddin Farah. Bayreuth African Studies Vol. 32, 2nd edition, Bayreuth: 2004.

An issue of Tydskrif vir letterkunde (vol. 57, no. 1, 2020) contained 17 articles about Nuruddin Farah and his work.

External links

 
"Nuruddin Farah", Lettre Ulysses Award for the Art of Reportage, 2006.
Geetha Ganga, "Somalia in the fiction of Nuruddin Farah", Afrikan Sarvi.
"Nuruddin Farah: By the Book", The New York Times, 13 November 2014.
"Novelist Nuruddin Farah: Facing A Blank Page Is 'Bravest Thing' A Writer Does" (interview), NPR, 25 October 2014.
Brittany Vickers, "Somali Author Nuruddin Farah Speaks Truth to Power" (interview), Ebony, 14 January 2015.
Lebohang Mojapelo, "'The majority of writers in Africa, of us, confine ourselves, rather than having great ambition'—An interview with Nuruddin Farah", Johannesburg Review of Books, 10 April 2020.

1945 births
Living people
Ethnic Somali people
Panjab University alumni
Somalian novelists
Somalian writers
The New Yorker people
20th-century novelists
21st-century novelists
20th-century dramatists and playwrights
Alumni of the University of Essex
Alumni of the University of London
Somalian expatriates in the United States
20th-century male writers
21st-century male writers